is an air base of the Japan Air Self-Defense Force (JASDF), the United States Air Force, and the United States Navy located in Misawa, Aomori, in the northern part of the island of Honshū of Japan. It is a Pacific Air Forces (PACAF) facility with the 35th Fighter Wing (35 FW, about 48 F-16 aircraft split among the 13th and 14th Fighter Squadrons) as its host wing. It hosts both Japanese and American troops.

History

Origins 
What is now called Misawa Air Base has been used by the military since the Meiji period, when it was used as a cavalry training center for the Imperial Army.

In 1870, the Emperor Meiji established a stud farm for the household cavalry in the area that later became Misawa AB, and kept his own (Tenno Heika) cavalry there until 1931, when the Sino-Japanese conflict required their use in China. Misawa remained a training center for Japanese Cavalry until the Japanese Army constructed the first runway at Misawa for military aircraft in 1938.

Misawa Air Base was near the takeoff site of the world's first non-stop trans-Pacific flight in 1931. Clyde Pangborn and Hugh Herndon took off from a gravel runway on Sabishiro Beach near Misawa in the aircraft known as Miss Veedol, landing 41 hours later in Wenatchee, Washington, thereby successfully crossing the Pacific Ocean. The runway is commemorated by a large sign in the coastal forest and is a popular beach and recreation area for Misawa AB personnel.  The cities of Wenatchee and Misawa cemented their special relationship by becoming official sister cities in 1981, strengthening their friendship through annual cultural exchange programs.

The Imperial Army transformed Misawa into an air base in 1938 when it was used as a base for long-range bombers. By early 1941, the Genzan Flying Corps trained at Misawa. The base was taken over by the Imperial Navy Air Corps in 1942, when the 22d Imperial Naval Air Wg assumed control of the base and the mission was changed to research and development. In 1944, facilities were built for Kamikaze Special Attack forces.

World War II 
Before the outbreak of World War II, Lake Ogawara at Misawa was used by the Imperial Japanese Navy Air Service to practice for the attack on Pearl Harbor. The lake was used because it was similar in depth to Pearl Harbor. The Japanese military fashioned hills near the shore of the lake to resemble the shapes of Battleships and Cruisers that were anchored in Pearl Harbor. This provided for a realistic view for their pilots from the air. The pilots conducted low level bombing runs, dropping torpedoes into the shallow depths of Lake Ogawara. This practice developed and refined the method to attack the ships that were anchored at Pearl Harbor. During World War II, the Misawa area was heavily damaged (base 90 percent destroyed) by U.S. fighters and bombers.

Postwar era
The American occupation of Misawa began in September 1945. Misawa had to be almost completely reconstructed by occupying U.S. forces by Army engineers who restored the base for future use by the United States Army Air Forces. During the Korean War and Vietnam War, Misawa supported fighter missions. The base was the launching point for clandestine surveillance overflights into China and the USSR during the 1950s.

After the immediate postwar reconstruction of facilities, the first permanent USAAF tenant was the 613th Air Control and Warning Squadron (613th AC&WS), taking up residence on July 15, 1946 and providing air traffic control in the Misawa area for the next decade.

49th Fighter Bomber Wing 
The first operational fighter wing was the 49th Fighter-Bomber Group, being reassigned to Misawa on March 31, 1948. The 49th had three operational squadrons, the 7th, 8th and 9th, and flew the P-80 Shooting Star along with a few P-61 Black Widow night fighters. The 49th FBW performed occupation duties in Japan and took part in maneuvers and surveillance patrols as part of Far East Air Forces. In February 1950, the unit was redesignated as the 49th Fighter-Bomber Wing, with the group being its operational component.

Korean War 
With the outbreak of the Korean War in June 1950, the 49th Fighter-Bomber Group was split off from the wing and was one of the first USAF units dispatched to Korea from Japan, its tactical squadrons began operations with F-51D Mustangs as the F-51D performed the ground support role better than the Shooting Stars. The group was rejoined with the wing in December 1950 when the Wing was reassigned to Taegu AB (K-2).

At Misawa, the 49th was replaced by the 6163d Air Base Wing to perform host and occupation duties. The 41st Fighter-Interceptor Squadron from the 35th FIW at Johnson AB was deployed to Misawa to provide air defense starting in September 1950, remaining until February 1951, being replaced by the 40th FIS also from Johnson AB, which remained until July. The 27th Fighter-Escort Wing was transferred from Taegu to Misawa in October, and remained at the base until January 20, 1953 to provide air defense flying straight-winged Republic F-84G Thunderjets which proved inadequate against the North Korean MiG-15s it encountered over Korean airspace.

Between May and August 1953, the 12th Strategic Fighter Wing pulled a rotational TDY at Misawa relieving the 27th and being relieved in turn by the 31st Strategic Fighter Wing. remaining until February 12, 1954. The 12th SFW returned for a second TDY in May 1954, remaining until August.

The 49th Fighter-Bomber Wing was relieved from its duties in South Korea on November 7, 1953 and resumed its host duties at the base. It remained at Misawa until December 10, 1957, however its operational control of its squadrons and group came under the 39th Air Division on March 1, 1955.

Cold War

39th Air Division 
On March 1, 1952, the 39th Air Division was established at Misawa, and through January 15, 1968, the Air Division controlled all of the units responsible for the air defense of north Japan, which included northern Honshū and Hokkaidō islands and the contiguous territorial waters.

Wings controlled by the 39th AD were:

 49th Fighter Bomber Wing March 1, 1955 – April 15, 1957
4th Fighter Bomber Wing March 8, 1955 – December 8, 1957
21st Tactical Fighter Wing November 10, 1958 – June 18, 1960

Squadrons controlled by the 39th AD were:

 4th Fighter Interceptor Squadron March 1, 1955 – June 20, 1965
45th Tactical Reconnaissance Squadron April 25, 1960 – January 15, 1968
67th Tactical Fighter Squadron December 15, 1967 – January 15, 1968
 339th Fighter Interceptor Squadron March 1, 1955 – January 15, 1958
 356th Tactical Fighter Squadron November 29, 1965 – January 15, 1968
 416th Tactical Fighter Squadron June 18, 1960 – June 16, 1964
 418th Fighter Day Squadron December 10, 1957 – March 25, 1958
 531st Tactical Fighter Squadron June 18, 1960 – June 16, 1964
 612th Tactical Fighter Squadron November 3, 1965 – January 15, 1968.

In this role the 39th trained the assigned units and controlled aerial interception missions when Japanese air space was violated. The division also controlled air refueling and ECM missions, and trained personnel of the Japanese Air Self Defense Force in flying operations, radar operations and maintenance, and proper radio procedures.

After the Soviet Union shot down an RB-29 aircraft on November 7, 1954, the 39th provided fighter escort for all friendly reconnaissance aircraft flying near Soviet territory and the Northern Air Defense Sector.

The division also supported combat operations during the Vietnam War.

Aircraft flown by the 39th AD included the F-84, 1952–1954, 1958–1959; KB-29, 1953–1954; North American F-86 Sabre, 1954–1960; F-100, 1957–1964; F-102, 1960–1965; RF-101, 1960–1968; F-105, 1967–1968.

Japanese Air Forces 
The first Japanese Air Self-Defense Force (JASDF) units were activated at Misawa in October 1954, and the first Japanese Northern Air Defense Force units began operations in 1957.

475th Air Base Wing 
The 31st Air Division was inactivated on January 15, 1968, and was replaced at Misawa by the 475th Air Base Wing. The operational squadron at the base was the 67th Tactical Fighter Squadron, being deployed to Misawa from the 18th Tactical Fighter Wing based at Kadena AB, Okinawa. The squadron remained detached at Misawa until March 15, 1971 when the flight line was transferred to the United States Navy and all U.S. Air Force fighter sorties ended.

6112th Air Base Group 

The 6112th ABG took over the base host duties at Misawa in 1971, with the inactivation of the 475th ABW. For the next several years, Misawa's focus was with the electronic intelligence gathering mission of the 6921st (later 6920th) Security Wing of the U.S. Air Force Security Service. The 6112th ABG performed PACAF administrative duties. The flight line was controlled by Naval Aviation units, with the JASDF operating from its own flight lines. The JASDF took over control of the airspace over Misawa on October 1, 1978.

During this period, the base hosted various Allied exercises in the region and the 6112th ABG provided support for 13 Air Force associated non-flying units, 14 DOD agencies and the JASDF units stationed in the Misawa area until September 1, 1982.

In 1983, Misawa was a major deployment site for rescue and recovery operations, following the downing of Korean Air Flight 007.

432d Tactical Fighter Wing 
In July 1984, the 432d Tactical Fighter Wing was reactivated at Misawa on the resumption of operational PACAF flying. The 432d controlled two F-16 Fighting Falcon squadrons (13th, 14th FS) and a rescue squadron (39th RQS) flying the HH-53 "Super Jolly Green Giant" helicopter.

Post Cold War 

The 35th Fighter Wing was redesignated and reassigned October 1, 1994 when it inactivated at Naval Air Station Keflavik, Iceland and was reactivated the same day at Misawa where the wing assumed the missions and responsibilities previously performed by the 432nd Fighter Wing.

Near the 1995 new year, Misawa experienced two earthquakes—7.5 and 7.9 on the Richter scale at the epicenter off the coast of Hachinohe.

On July 25, 1998, a US F-16 based at Misawa was unable to become airborne and collided with an antenna array at the east end of Misawa's runway and exploded. The pilot ejected, but landed in the flaming wreckage of the jet. He succumbed to his injuries on September 17th, 1998 at Brooke Army Medical Center.

Global War on Terror 
On September 25, 2003, a magnitude 8.3 earthquake occurred off the east coast of Hokkaidō which was strongly felt in Misawa and all of Aomori Prefecture. Damage to Misawa Air Base was limited to burst water mains, cosmetic cracks in walls and personal property damage. There were no reports of damage to the base runway. This was the largest earthquake reported by the U.S. Geological Survey (USGS) for 2003.

On July 17, 2007, a US F-16 from Misawa, while deployed to the 13th Expeditionary Fighter Squadron, Balad AB, Iraq crashed after delinquent tire pressure testing and pilot misinterpretation. The pilot ejected safely and there were no injuries or deaths. 

The base was slightly damaged by the March 2011 Tōhoku earthquake and tsunami and experienced a black out. There were concerns about flooding from the tsunami reaching the base, and about a nearby nuclear facility, the Rokkasho Reprocessing Plant.

After the quake, personnel and aircraft from the base assisted with Operation Tomodachi. The base also served as an important hub for airlifted assistance during the disaster recovery efforts. During the crisis, around 1,400 American family members voluntarily departed the base for locations outside Japan.

In April 2015, two US F-16s based at Misawa made an emergency landing at a local airport after oil started leaking from one of the fighters.

In October 2016, four Royal Air Force Typhoon fighters from  No. 2 Squadron RAF supported by a Voyager aerial tanker and a C-17 deployed to Misawa for the first bilateral exercises in Japan for the JASDF to host conducted with non-U.S. forces.

On February 20, 2018, a US F-16 based at Misawa dumped two external fuel tanks into the nearby Lake Ogawara after experiencing an engine fire.

On January 14, 2019, a US F-16 based at Misawa made a precautionary landing at a Japanese regional airport after a problem with the aircraft. It was later revealed that this was due to a plastic piece falling off of the aircraft mid-flight.

On April 3, 2019, a Japanese F-35A based at Misawa crashed over the Pacific Ocean approximately 85 miles East of Misawa Air Base. The cause was attributed to the pilot experiencing spatial disorientation. The JASDF proceeded to ground their F-35 fleet until safety inspections and additional training for pilots on spatial disorientation could be completed. Some debris from the aircraft was recovered, however, the pilot's remains were not recovered until June 2019. 
 
On November 1, 2019, a US F-16 based at Misawa accidentally dropped an inert training device about 3 miles North of Misawa Air Base's Draughon Range, into a privately owned field. There were no injuries or deaths.

On February 2, 2020, the 35th Fighter Wing Commander temporarily tightened the base's curfew and prohibited the consumption of alcohol off-post until March 2nd, 2020. This was due to 5 DUI cases and eight other alcohol related incidents over the course of December 2019 and January 2020.

In May 2021, the US Navy forward deployed Unmanned Patrol Squadron 19, operating two MQ-4C Tritons, from Andersen AFB to Naval Air Facility Misawa under CTF-72. The aircraft returned to Andersen AFB in Oct 2021.

Post Global War on Terror 
On December 1, 2021, a US F-16 based at Misawa dropped its external fuel tank in the town of Fukaura, Aomori, during an in-flight emergency. The fuel tank fell near homes and the town hall of Fukaura. There were no injuries or deaths following the incident, and the F-16 made an emergency landing at Aomori Airport. The Japanese Ministry of Defense requested the base ground all F-16s, until it could be determined they were fit to fly.

In March 2022, The Japan Air Self Defense Force acquired the first of three RQ-4B Global Hawks which were stationed at Misawa as part of the 3rd Air Wing. All three are scheduled to be delivered by the end of 2022. 

In September 2022, the 35th Aircraft Maintenance Squadron was inactivated and split into the 13th and 14th Fighter Generation Squadrons under the 35th Maintenance Group.

Major commands to which assigned

Far East Air Forces, (September–December 1945)

 Redesignated: Pacific Air Command, United States Army, (December 1945 – January 1947)
 Redesignated: Far East Air Forces, (January 1947 – July 1957)
 Redesignated: Pacific Air Forces, (July 1957 – July 1972)
Air Defense Command (Attached), (September 1950 – June 1965)

United States Air Force Security Service, (July 1972 – October 1978)
Pacific Air Forces, (October 1978–present)

Major Operating Units 

 32d Army Engineering Construction Group*, September 1945 – August 1948
 49th Fighter-Bomber Group, March 31, 1948 – January 23, 1950
 49th Fighter (later Fighter-Bomber) Wing*, August 18, 1948 – December 1, 1950
 41st Fighter-Interceptor Squadron (Air Defense), September 6, 1950 – February 20, 1951
 Detachment from Johnson Air Base, Japan
 6163d Air Base Wing*, December 1, 1950 – November 2, 1951
 40th Fighter-Interceptor Squadron (Air Defense), May 25 – July 1, 1951
 116th Fighter-Bomber Wing*, November 1, 1951 – July 1, 1952
 Federalized Georgia Air National Guard
 6016th Air Base Wing, January 1, 1952 – November 18, 1953
 39th Air Division, March 1, 1952 – January 15, 1968
 474th Fighter-Bomber Wing, July 10, 1952 – April 1, 1953
 27th Fighter-Escort Wing, October 9, 1952 – January 20, 1953
 31st Fighter-Escort (later Strategic Fighter) Wing, July 20 – October 11, 1952; November 11, 1953 – February 12, 1954
 12th Strategic Fighter Wing, May 15, 1953 – August 10, 1953
 49th Air Base Group*, April 1, 1953 – December 10, 1957
 49th Fighter-Bomber Wing*, November 7, 1953 – December 10, 1957
 49th Fighter-Bomber Group, June 1 – December 10, 1957
 506th Fighter-Escort Wing, August 15 – November 15, 1953
 12th Strategic Fighter Wing, May 12 – August 11, 1954
 16th Fighter-Interceptor Squadron (Air Defense), July 1 – August 1, 1954
 4th Fighter-Interceptor Squadron (Air Defense), August 1, 1954 – June 20, 1965
 336th Fighter-Interceptor (later Fighter-Bomber, Fighter-Day) Squadron, November 19, 1954 – August 7, 1956
 45th Tactical Reconnaissance Squadron, March 3, 1955 – November 15, 1963

 6921st Radio Squadron
 Redesignated: 6921st Radio Group
 Redesignated: 6921st Security Wing, May 8, 1955 – February 1, 1976
 JASDF Northern Air Defense Force, July 15, 1957 – present
 6139th Air Base Group*, October 10, 1957 – January 8, 1964
 416th Fighter-Bomber (later Tactical Fighter) Squadron, March 25, 1958 – June 15, 1964
 531st Tactical Fighter Squadron, July 1, 1958 – June 15, 1964
 Redesignated: 439th Air Base Group*, January 8, 1964 – January 15, 1968
 Redesignated: 475th Tactical Fighter Wing*, January 15, 1968 – March 15, 1971
 612th Tactical Fighter Squadron, November 3, 1965 – May 15, 1971
 356th Tactical Fighter Squadron, November 29, 1965 – May 15, 1971
 67th Tactical Fighter Squadron, December 15, 1967 – March 15, 1971
 391st Tactical Fighter Squadron, July 22, 1968 – February 28, 1971
 16th Tactical Reconnaissance Squadron, March 16, 1970 – February 15, 1971
 3d Tactical Fighter Wing, March 15, 1971 – September 16, 1974
 6122d Air Base Group*, March 15, 1971 – July 1, 1972
 U.S. Naval Security Group Activity, July 1, 1971 – December 29, 2005
 Redesignated: U.S. Navy Information Operations Command Misawa, December 29, 2005 – October 14, 2014
 6920th Air Base Group*, July 1, 1972 – February 1, 1976
 Redesignated: 6920th Security Wing*, February 1, 1976 – October 1, 1978
 6112th Air Base Group*, October 1, 1978 – July 1, 1984
 432d Tactical Fighter Wing*, July 1, 1984 – October 31, 1994
 35th Fighter Wing* October 31, 1994 – present

Role and operations 
Misawa is the only combined, joint service installation in the western Pacific. It houses three U.S. military services (Air Force, Navy, and Army), as well as the Japan Air Self-Defense Force. The base is home to 5,200 US military personnel, as well as 350 US civilian employees and 900 Japanese national employees.

The Misawa Passive Radio Frequency space surveillance site was used for tracking satellites using the signals they transmit. It also provided coverage of geosynchronous satellites using the Deep Space Tracking System (DSTS) but was dismantled around 2002. The Misawa Security Operations Center (MSOC), located in the northwestern part of the Air Base, is believed to be one of the largest ECHELON ground stations.

United States

The United States Air Force's 35th Fighter Wing (35 FW) is the host unit at Misawa Air Base. The wing conducts daily F-16 flight training to maintain its combat readiness. Its pilots fly air-to-air weapons delivery exercises over water and sharpen their air-to-ground skills using the Draughon Gunnery Range (formerly Ripsaw Range) located 12 miles north of Misawa.

Four groups are assigned to the 35th Fighter Wing: the 35th Maintenance Group, the 35th Mission Support Group, 35th Medical Group and 35th Operations Group. Operational fighter squadrons of the 35th Operations Group are:

13th Fighter Squadron "Panthers", Red tail stripe
14th Fighter Squadron "Samurais", Yellow tail stripe

Both squadrons fly the Block 50 F-16C/D "Wild Weasels", and use the tail code of "WW" (before adopting the "WW" tail code, the code "MJ" (for Misawa, Japan) was carried.

U.S. Navy

 Naval Air Facility Misawa
 Commander, Patrol and Reconnaissance Force Seventh Fleet (COMPATRECONFORSEVENTHFLT, Task Force 72). In 2018 this force is an additional designation for Commander, Patrol and Reconnaissance Wing 1.
 Aircraft Intermediate Maintenance Department (AIMD) Misawa
 Navy Munitions Command East Asia Division (NMC EAD) Unit Misawa
 Rotational squadrons and detachments of P-8A Poseidon and EA-18G Growler aircraft on six-month deployments to NAF Misawa

U.S. Defense Contractor
 CUBIC Defense Applications ACMI

Based units 
Flying and notable non-flying units based at Misawa Air Base.

United States Air Force 
Pacific Air Forces (PACAF)

 Fifth Air Force
 35th Fighter Wing (Host Wing)
 35th Comptroller Squadron
 35th Fighter Wing Staff Agencies
 35th Fighter Wing Chaplain
 35th Fighter Wing Retiree Activities Office
 35th Fighter Wing Command Post
 35th Fighter Wing Inspector General
 35th Fighter Wing Plans, Programs, and Inspections
 35th Fighter Wing Legal
 35th Fighter Wing Public Affairs
 35th Fighter Wing Safety
 35th Fighter Wing Equal Opportunity Office
 35th Fighter Wing Protocol
 35th Fighter Wing School Liaison
 35th Fighter Wing Sexual Assault Prevention and Response (SAPR) Office
 35th Operations Group
 13th Fighter Squadron – F-16CJ/DJ Fighting Falcon
 14th Fighter Squadron – F-16CJ/DJ Fighting Falcon
 35th Operations Support Squadron
 610th Air Control Flight
 35th Maintenance Group
 13th Fighter Generation Squadron
 14th Fighter Generation Squadron
 35th Maintenance Squadron
 35th Medical Group
 35th Operational Medical Readiness Squadron
 35th Dental Squadron
 35th Healthcare Operations Squadron
 35th Medical Support Squadron
 35th Surgical Operations Squadron
 35th Mission Support Group
 35th Civil Engineer Squadron
 35th Contracting Squadron
 35th Communications Squadron
 35th Force Support Squadron
 35th Logistics Readiness Squadron
 35th Security Forces Squadron

Air Education and Training Command (AETC)
Second Air Force
82nd Training Wing
982nd Training Group
372nd Training Squadron
Detachment 23 (GSU)

Air Force Office of Special Investigations (AFOSI)
Detachment 623 (GSU)

Civil Air Patrol (CAP)
Misawa Cadet Squadron (NHQ-113)

United States Navy 
Commander, Navy Installations Command (CINC)

Naval Air Facility Misawa
Air Operations Department – UC-12F Huron

Commander, Naval Air Force, Pacific (COMNAVAIRPAC)

 Patrol and Reconnaissance Wing 1
 Task Force 72 – EP-3 Aries, P-8A Poseidon, and E/A-18G Growler

United States Army 
Army Space and Missile Defense Command (ASMDC)
1st Space Brigade
1st Space Battalion
1st Space Company
Joint Tactical Ground Station (JTAGS)
Detachment Delta

Japan Air Self Defense Force 
Air Defense Command

Northern Air Defense Force Headquarters
Northern Air Command Support Flight – Kawasaki T-4
3rd Air Wing 
3rd Tactical Fighter Squadron – F-2A/B, T-4 and F-35 Lightning II
Airborne Early Warning Wing
601st Squadron – E-2C Hawkeye
Air Rescue Wing
Misawa Helicopter Airlift Squadron – CH-47J Chinook

Climate 

Like most of the Tōhoku region, the local area around Misawa AB has a humid temperate climate with warm summers, and cold, though not extreme, winters.

Education 
The Department of Defense operates two schools that serve the children of the American military and civilian personnel stationed at the base.
 Sollars Elementary School, home of the Dragons
 Robert D. Edgren High School, home of the Eagles

Higher educational opportunities for those in the military and working for the Department of Defense, as well as for family members at Misawa are available through several contracted academic institutions. For example:
 The Asian Division of University of Maryland University College (UMUC)
 Central Texas College
 University of Phoenix

See also 

 AN/FLR-9
 Treaty of Mutual Cooperation and Security between the United States and Japan
 U.S.–Japan Status of Forces Agreement

References

Citations

Sources 
 General

 
 Some of the text in this article was taken from pages on the Misawa Air Base website, which as a work of the U.S. Government is presumed to be a public domain resource. That information was supplemented by:
 Fletcher, Harry R. (1989) Air Force Bases Volume II, Active Air Force Bases outside the United States of America on September 17, 1982. Maxwell AFB, Alabama: Office of Air Force History. 
 Rogers, Brian (2005). United States Air Force Unit Designations Since 1978. Hinkley, England: Midland Publications. .

External links

Misawa Air Base at U.S. Air Force web site
NIOC Misawa at U.S. Navy web site
Misawa Air Base at GlobalSecurity.org
Misawa Airport Terminal Company (civilian passenger terminal)

the Insider for Local Information
SAPPORO INN  for Housing Info
Wenatchee Valley Misawa Sister City Association

Airfields of the United States Army Air Forces in Occupied Japan
Airports established in 1938
Airports in Japan
Installations of the United States Air Force in Japan
Aomori Prefecture
Misawa
Transport in Aomori Prefecture
Misawa, Aomori
1938 establishments in Japan